The  is a yōkai in Japanese mythology.

Mythology
The ungaikyō is a tsukumogami that is in the form of a possessed mirror. They can manipulate their reflection to resemble what they prefer. Any human who looks into the ungaikyō sees a transformed monstrous version of themselves in the reflection. It has also been used by humans to trap spirits in them.

External links
 Ungaikyō at Yokai.com

Yōkai
Tsukumogami